Sunmachine is the debut album released by British electronic music trio Dario G on 8 June 1998 through the Warner label. According to the notes on its single "Sunchyme", it was originally set to be titled Super Dario Land.

Track listing
"Sunchyme" – 6:19
"Carnaval de Paris" – 5:09
"Sunmachine" (featuring David Bowie) – 7:19
"Voices" (featuring Vanessa Quiñones) – 5:20
"Be My Friend" (featuring Deepika) – 8:08
"Peaches" – 6:17
"Malaway" – 7:18
"Revolution" – 9:16
"Voices"  (featuring Vanessa Quiñones) – 3:27
"End of the Beginning" – 10:30

Charts

References

1998 debut albums
Dance music albums by English artists
Warner Music Group albums